The 2009 Individual European Championship will be the 9th UEM Individual Speedway European Championship season. The final took place on 23 August, 2009 in Tolyatti, Russia. The championship was won by Renat Gafurov (Russia), who beat Andriej Karpov (Ukraine) and Aleš Dryml, Jr. (Czech Republic) in Run-Off. The defending champion, Matej Žagar, lost in semi-final 3.

Calendar

Qualifying rounds

Semi-finals

Final 
The Final
 23 August 2009 (16:00 UTC+5)
  Tolyatti, Stadium “STROITEL” (Length: 353 m)
Referee:  Anthony Steele
Jury President:  Andrzej Grodzki
Change:
(10)  Adrian Gomólski (injury) → track reserve Darkin
(5)  Rafał Trojanowski → track reserve A.Dryml, Jr.
(17)  A.Dryml, Jr. →  Manuel Hauzinger → None
(18)  Darkin →  Patrick Hougaard → None
{7}  Jurica Pavlic → Dubinin

See also 
 motorcycle speedway

References 

2009
European Individual